Joseph Galloway (1731–1803) was an American Loyalist and Congressman.

Joseph or Joe or Joey Galloway may also refer to:
Joseph L. Galloway (1941–2021), American journalist
Joey Galloway (born 1971), American football wide receiver